The 2nd Junior Open European Championships is being held from 1 to 5 February 2017 in Nove Mesto, Czech Republic.There are a total of 6 competitions: sprint, pursuit and individual races for men and women.

Schedule
All times are local (UTC+1).

Medal summary

Medal table

Men

Women

References

External links
Official website
IBU

IBU Junior Open European Championships
IBU
IBU
IBU
International sports competitions hosted by the Czech Republic
Biathlon competitions in the Czech Republic
February 2017 sports events in Europe